Beach Boys' Party! Uncovered and Unplugged is a compilation and remix album released by Capitol Records on November 20, 2015. It is an 81-track expansion of Beach Boys' Party!, presenting it without informal chatter overdubs followed by a selection of outtakes collected from the album's original five recording sessions.

Background

Cover versions which did not feature on the original album include renditions of "One Kiss Led to Another", "You've Lost That Lovin' Feelin'", "Hang On Sloopy", "Twist and Shout", "The Diary", "Laugh at Me", "Ticket to Ride", "Blowin' in the Wind", "Riot in Cell Block Number 9", "Satisfaction", "Smokey Joe's Cafe", "Long Tall Sally", and "Heart and Soul". "Ruby Baby" was also not included on the original album but was released on the 1993 box set Good Vibrations: Thirty Years of The Beach Boys.

Reception

PopMatters stated: "Most of these [tracks] would only be of interest to the Beach Boys’ special fans, but the new cleaned-up versions of the dozen original cuts are worthy of everyone's attention. ... [they] may not be a revelation to long time Beach Boys fans who always sensed the quality of the recordings, but it is a lot more pleasurable than the padded party noises ever conveyed."

Track listing

Disc one

Disc two

Personnel
Credits from band archivist Craig Slowinski.
The Beach Boys
 Al Jardine – vocals, 6 and 12 string guitars, ashtray
 Bruce Johnston – vocals, electric bass
 Mike Love – vocals
 Brian Wilson – vocals, bass, piano, bongos
 Carl Wilson – vocals, 6 and 12 string guitars, bass
 Dennis Wilson – vocals, bongos, castanet, harmonica
Additional musicians

References

2015 compilation albums
2015 remix albums
The Beach Boys compilation albums
Capitol Records compilation albums
Albums recorded at United Western Recorders
Covers albums